Paddle boat may refer to:

 Paddle steamer or paddleboat, a boat propelled by a paddle wheel
 Pedalo, a boat propelled by pedalling with the feet
 A boat which is paddled, such as a canoe or kayak